Loring may refer to:

Places

United States
Loring, Alaska, a census-designated place
Loring, Missouri, a ghost town
Loring, Montana, an unincorporated town
Loring Park, a park located in Minneapolis
Charles Loring Highway, part of U.S. Route 1 in Maine

Fictional
Loring, Gloucestershire, a fictional English market town in the 1870 novel The Vicar of Bullhampton

Other uses
Loring (surname), various people
Talleres Loring, a Spanish aircraft manufacturer
Loring Air Force Base, Limestone, Maine, United States, active from 1953 to 1995
Loring International Airport, Limestone, Maine, United States
, a British frigate in commission in the Royal Navy from 1943 to 1945

See also
Port Loring, Ontario, Canada, a community